Storozhevoye 1-ye is a rural locality (a selo) and the administrative center of Storozhevoye 1-ye Rural Settlement, Ostrogozhsky District, Voronezh Oblast, Russia. The population was 804 as of 2010. There are 9 streets.

Geography 
Storozhevoye 1-ye is located on the right bank of the Don River, 51 km north of Ostrogozhsk (the district's administrative centre) by road. Anoshkino is the nearest rural locality.

References 

Rural localities in Ostrogozhsky District
Korotoyaksky Uyezd